Manufacturing in Vietnam after reunification followed a pattern that was initially the reverse of the record in agriculture; it showed recovery from a depressed base in the early postwar years. However, this recovery stopped in the late 1970s as the war in Cambodia and the threat from China caused the government to redirect food, finance, and other resources to the military. This move worsened shortages and intensified old bottlenecks. At the same time, the invasion of Cambodia cost Vietnam urgent foreign economic support. China's attack on Vietnam in 1979 compounded industrial problems by damaging important industrial facilities in the North, particularly a major steel plant and an apatite mine.

National objectives
National leadership objectives during the immediate postwar period included consolidating the Northern factories and workshops that had been scattered and hidden during the war to improve their chances of survival and nationalizing banks and major factories in the South to bring the financial and industrial sectors under state control. The government's continued use of wartime planning mechanisms that prioritized output targets over  production or long-term costs caused profits to erode and increased the government's financial burdens.

Economic reforms

The economic reforms undertaken in 1977 gave factory management some independence in formulating production plans, arranging production resources, and containing production expenses. Additional pragmatic steps such as the adoption of incentive-structured wages and the realignment of prices to better reflect costs of production were also considered.

This first experiment with reform was relatively short-lived. This was partly because it ran counter to the overriding policy of socializing the South and integrating it with the North by reducing the centralized administrative control needed to do the job. Some reform measures stayed on the books, however, and were revived in the 1980s.

Statistics
Vietnamese statistics indicate that the gross value of industrial output in 1980 was not much higher than in 1976 and that the value of output per capita declined more than 8 percent. For example, cement production was relatively stagnant; it averaged 1.7 million tons annually during the Second Five-Year Plan, but only 1.4 million tons in 1985.

Industrial production

Some light industry and handicrafts sectors mirrored the difficulties experienced in agriculture because they used agricultural raw materials. By 1980 the Vietnamese press was reporting that many grain, food-product, and consumer-goods processing enterprises had reduced production or ceased operations entirely. Although detailed statistics on sector performance were insufficient to show annual results, the total value of light industry output peaked in 1978; by 1980 it was nearly 3 percent lower than it had been in 1976. Increasingly severe shortages of food (particularly grain and fish) and industrial consumer goods lessened workers' incentives.

Total industrial production during the Third Five-Year Plan reflected high levels of investment, averaging some 40 percent of total annual investment during the plan period. In 1985 the industrial sector accounted for some 32 percent of national income, up from approximately 20 percent in 1980.

From 1981 through 1985, industrial growth was unevenly distributed and in many instances simply restored production levels to their 1976 levels. The highest production growth rates were recorded in the manufacture of paper products (32 percent per year), and food processing (42 percent per year). Both sectors had declined in production during the Second Five-Year Plan. Production of processed sugar increased from 271,000 tons in 1981 to 434,000 tons in 1985, almost ten times the 1975 production level. The processing of ocean fish increased from 385,000 tons in 1980 to 550,000 tons in 1985, not quite reaching 1976 and 1977 levels, but clearly reversing the steady decline this sector had experienced in the late 1970s. (The decline had been generated in part by the use of fishing boats in the South as escape craft to flee the communist regime.) Other light industries grew at annual rates of 10 percent or more during the early 1980s, which essentially restored production to 1975 or 1976 levels. Brick production increased steadily to 3.7 billion bricks in 1985, after regular declines during the previous plan. Production of glass reached 41,000 tons in 1985, exceeding 1975 levels for the first time. Paper production in 1985 again reached the 1976 level of 75,000 tons, up from 42,000 tons at the beginning of the plan in 1981; and the textile subsector exhibited an 8-percent average annual growth rate during the plan period as cloth production more than doubled to 380 million square meters in 1985.

Among heavy industries, machine-building and chemical industries (including rubber) registered annual average production gains of approximately 25 percent. Chemical fertilizer production continued to exceed the 1975 level and, in 1985, reached 516,000 tons despite relatively underdeveloped mining and enrichment processes for apatite and pyrite ore and underutilization of the Lam Thao Superphosphate of Lime plant (Vinh Phu Province). Pesticide production also maintained a decade-long growth trend to reach 11.74 billion tons in 1985.

Current status

Although the industry contributed 40.1 percent of gross domestic product (GDP) in 2004, it employed only 12.9 percent of the workforce. In 2000, 22.4 percent of industrial production was attributable to non-state activities. During 1994–2004, the industrial GDP grew at an average annual rate of 10.3 percent. Manufacturing contributed 20.3 percent of GDP in 2004, while employing 10.2 percent of the workforce. During 1994–2004, the manufacturing GDP grew at an average annual rate of 11.2 percent. The manufacturing sectors—food processing, cigarettes and tobacco, textiles, chemicals, and electrical goods—grew rapidly. Almost a third of manufacturing and retail activity is concentrated in Ho Chi Minh City.

Total industry output from 2007 was 574,047 billion VND (+17.1 % year on year), in which: SOEs + 10.3% year on year and accounts 24% of total country industry output, Non-SOEs +20.9%yoy acc. 36.9%, FIEs +21.3%yoy acc. 39.1%. The industries that have achieved the highest growth rates (over targets) were: car manufacturing +52.2%, motomobike manufacturing + 19.2%, machine tools +69.8%, transformer + 17%, air-conditioner + 51.9%, washing machine manufacturing +21.3%, electricity fan + 18.6%, electricity +13.2%, steel +10.8%, clean coal +11.5%, cement +11.8%, seafood processing +12.6%, kraft paper +15.3%

In 2017, Vingroup started VINFAST Automobile Production Complex project in Dinh Vu - Cat Hai Economic Zone.

See also
Agriculture in Vietnam
Economy of Vietnam

References

Vietnam
Industry in Vietnam